Monocarboxylate transporter 1 is a ubiquitous protein that in humans is encoded by the SLC16A1 gene (also known as MCT1). It is a proton coupled monocarboxylate transporter.

Biochemistry
Detailed kinetic analysis of monocarboxylate transport in erythrocytes revealed that MCT1 operates through an ordered mechanism. MCT1 has a substrate binding site open to the extracellular matrix which binds a proton first followed by the lactate anion. The protein then undergoes a conformational change to a new ‘closed’’ conformation that exposes both the proton and lactate to the opposite surface of the membrane where they are released, lactate first and then the proton. For net transport of lactic acid, the rate-limiting step is the return of MCT1 without bound substrate to the open conformation. For this reason, exchange of one monocarboxylate inside the cell with another outside is considerably faster than net transport of a monocarboxylate across the membrane.

MCT1 can be upregulated by PPAR-α, Nrf2, and AMPK.

Animal studies 

Overexpression of MCT1 has been shown to increase the efficacy of an anti-cancer drug currently undergoing clinical trials called 3-bromopyruvate in breast cancer cells.

Clinical significance 

Most cases of alveolar soft part sarcoma show PAS(+), diastase-resistant (PAS-D (+)) intracytoplasmic crystals which contain CD147 and monocarboxylate transporter 1 (MCT1). Overexpression of MCT1 in pancreatic beta cells leads to hyperinsulinism during exercise.

References

Further reading 

 
 
 
 
 
 
 
 
 
 
 
 
 
 
 

Solute carrier family